Maira Kalman is an American artist, illustrator, writer, and designer known for her painting and writing about the human condition. She is the author and illustrator of over 30 books for adults and children and her work is exhibited in museums around the world. She has been a regular contributor to The New York Times and The New Yorker.

Early life 
Kalman was born in Tel Aviv, Israel. Her mother, Sara Berman, was originally from Belarus and had moved to Israel to escape pogroms.

When Kalman was four years old, her family moved to New York City. The family lived in Riverdale, Bronx. Her mother, Sara, spent a significant amount of time at the Loehmann's department store. She was known for her chic style, and she wore only the color white. Kalman attended the High School of Music & Art (now known as LaGuardia High School) where she studied art. Kalman attended New York University (NYU), where she studied English literature. By the time Kalman had left for college, her parents had returned to Israel.

At the age of 18, Kalman met designer Tibor Kalman at New York University, he was a native of Budapest who had moved to New York City as a child. She explained, "We met in this class of misfits in summer school. They said,  What was interesting was the mix of crazy people in that group... So we met there, and he asked me out on a date. And you know in your life, when you meet somebody [and] you go, 'I've known you for a thousand years,' and there's not even an iota of a question?"

Career

M&Co. 
In 1979, Tibor founded the graphic and design consultancy, M&Co. and Maira played an important role in the development of the company. She never actually worked at M & Co. but offered ideas, suggestions, and support. The firm grew to be highly influential; it was known for its innovative use of images and typography. M & Co. created work for Interview magazine, Restaurant Florent, the band Talking Heads, the National Audubon Society, and the Museum of Modern Art.

Inter-disciplinary arts practice 
Kalman's priorities began to shift with the birth of her children in the 1980s. Beginning in the mid-1980s, Kalman began to publish children's book. Her first children's book, Stay Up Late (1985), featured illustrations paired lyrics of musician David Byrne. The book told the story of children who prevent their baby brother from falling asleep.

After Tibor passed in 1999, Maira Kalman began creatively asserting herself, writing more than 20 books over the years. As mentioned in an interview in 2019, Kalman notes how she always had a passion for writing, and that she was always interested in the field. Kalman did not consider herself just a writer, but addressed that she was a storyteller, a journalist, a designer and a humorist. Over the course of her career, Kalman has written a series of children's books about Max Stravinsky, the poet-dog. She created the sets for the Mark Morris Dance Group production of Four Saints in Three Acts, an opera by Virgil Thompson and Gertrude Stein.

In addition, she has been a contributor for The New Yorker since 1995 and has produced many cover illustrations as well as illustrated columns. Most notably, Kalman collaborated with Rick Meyerowitz for The New Yorker December 2001 cover, called New Yorkistan. This cover created a lot of attention to the public since the magazine tackled tribalism in the city. The magazine emptied the newsstands within two days.

In 2002, Kalman's children's book, Fireboat: The Heroic Adventures of John J. Harvey, was released. This focuses on New York City's more recent terror attack on the twin towers. September 11, 2001, marks the day in which the twin towers fell. John J. Harvey served for the World Trade Center attack, being one of the first responding boats arriving to the attacks that day. This book educates many young individuals who may not have been around at the time. This book actively describes the history behind Harvey and the importance of this day.

The urban environment of New York City brings Kalman's creativity to life and has also drawn inspiration from the city's geography and well known landmarks. Her picture book both written and illustrated by Kalman, Fireboat: The Heroic Adventures of the John J. Harvey won the annual Boston Globe–Horn Book Award for Nonfiction in 2003.

In 2005, Kalman is also known for her illustrations for the 2005 edition of The Elements of Style, the popular guide to writing style, by William Strunk. She also designed production sets for an opera about Gertrude Stein.

Kalman wrote the monthly illustrated blog from April 2006 to April 2007, The Principles of Uncertainty, for the New York Times. The blog was published in a book of the same title, which was released in 2007. During 2009, Kalman wrote another illustrated blog in The New York Times called And the Pursuit of Happiness about American democracy. The blog was published as a book in 2010. The first chapter chronicles her visit to Washington, D.C. for President Barack Obama's inauguration. Kalman's work is also featured on Rosenbach Museum and Library's 21st Century Abe project.

Kalman crafted the illustrations for author Daniel Handler's Lemony Snicket series including the books, 13 Words (2010) and Why We Broke Up (2011). The two went on to collaborate on a illustrated book, Girls Standing on Lawns, published in 2014 by The Museum of Modern Art. Exploring MoMA's collection of photography, Kalman and Handler combined vintage photographs with Kalman's paintings and Handler's prose.

In 2014, My Favorite Things, by Maira Kalman, was published by Harper Design, a division of HarperCollins. The book focused on significant objects from the Cooper Hewitt and the personal collection of Kalman, such as a pocket watch possessed by Abraham Lincoln, original editions of Alice's Adventures in Wonderland and Winnie-the-Pooh, and photographs that Kalman had taken.

In 2017, she was awarded the AIGA Medal for her work in "storytelling, illustration, and design while pushing the limits of all three."

In the summer of 2017, Kalman collaborated with choreographer John Heginbotham to produce a theatrical and dance interpretation of Kalman's blog, The Principles of Uncertainty. It debuted in late August at Jacob's Pillow, and had its New York premier at the Brooklyn Academy of Music Fisher in late September. Kalman performed in the piece, playing herself. Then in the Fall of that year, Kalman was a resident at the American Academy in Rome.

From November 2019 to April 2020, Kalman's publications were exhibited at the Eric Carle Museum of Picture Book Art in Amherst, Massachusetts.

Exhibitions 
List of select exhibitions by Kalman:

2003 – Just Looking, Julie Saul Gallery, New York, NY
2005 – I Can't Stand All the Excitement, Julie Saul Gallery, New York, NY
2007 – The Principles of Uncertainty, Julie Saul Gallery, New York, NY
 2008 – Just Looking, Beihang University, Beijing, China
 2009 – The Elements of Style, Memorial Art Gallery, University of Rochester, Rochester, NY
 2010 – Contemporary Jewish Museum, San Francisco, CA; Institute of Contemporary Art, University of Pennsylvania, Philadelphia, PA
 2010 – Further Illuminations, Julie Saul Gallery, New York, NY
 2010 – Various Illuminations (of a Crazy World), The Jewish Museum, New York, NY; Skirball Cultural Center, Los Angeles, CA
 2011 – 25 Years/25 Artists, Julie Saul Gallery, New York, NY
 2011 – Storied City: New York in Picture Book Art, Katonah Museum of Art, Katonah, NY
 2012 – 37 Paintings, Julie Saul Gallery, New York, NY
 2013 – What Pete Ate from A to Z, Madison Children's Museum, Madison, Wisconsin
 2014 – Girls Standing on Lawns and Other Projects, Julie Saul Gallery, New York, New York
 2014 – Maira Kalman: My Favorite Things, The Cooper Hewitt National Design Museum, New York, NY
 2014 – The Elements of Style, The Frist Center for the Visual Arts, Nashville, TN
 2014 – Thomas Jefferson Life, Liberty and the Pursuit of Everything, Monticello, Charlottesville, VA
 2015 – Sara Berman's Closet, Mmuseumm, New York City, New York
 2017 – Sara Berman's Closet, in collaboration with Alex Kalman, The Metropolitan Museum of Art, New York City, New York
 2019 – The Pursuit of Everything: Maira Kalman's Books for Children, The High Museum of Art, Atlanta, Georgia
 2022 – Women Holding Things, Mary Ryan Gallery, New York City

Personal life 
Maira Kalman married designer Tibor Kalman in 1981. Over the course of their marriage, Maira and Tibor had two children, Lulu Bodoni and Alexander Onomatopoeia. They were married eighteen years until Tibor's death from non-Hodgkin's lymphoma in 1999. Her children attended the City and Country School in Greenwich Village.

Kalman's mother, Sara Berman, was the early source to her inspiration behind storytelling and book reading. As a mother daughter activity, Kalman and her mother would go to the library and connect themselves to the characters of the books they would read. In 2017, Kalman and her son Alexander got together with coordinators of The Metropolitan Museum of Art and created an exhibit dedicated to Kalman's mother called "Sara Berman's Closet." Sara Berman's Closet also became a memoir that Kalman and her son worked on in dedication to their loved family member.

In 2014, Kalman has also performed in a production of Peter & the Wolf directed by Isaac Mizrahi at the Guggenheim's Peter B. Lewis Theater in New York City. Kalman's character is the duck, which is represented by the sound of an oboe.

Kalman lives in Greenwich Village in New York City.

Bibliography

References

External links 
 
 
 "The illustrated woman" (TED2007)
 Maira Kalman in conversation with Paul Holdengraber at LIVE from the New York Public Library October 23, 2007
 Studio Visit: Maira Kalman, The Paris Review
 Interview with Maira Kalman in Nashville Review
 
 "Maira Kalman: Various Illuminations (of a Crazy World)" Exhibition (2011) at the Jewish Museum, New York

1949 births
American children's book illustrators
American children's writers
American women illustrators
American women children's writers
American graphic designers
The High School of Music & Art alumni
Israeli children's writers
Israeli emigrants to the United States
Israeli graphic designers
Israeli illustrators
Israeli women illustrators
Israeli women children's writers
Israeli Jews
Jewish women artists
Jewish American artists
Living people
The New Yorker people
People from Tel Aviv
American women graphic designers
21st-century American Jews
21st-century American women
AIGA medalists